Dreams of Glory (Spanish: Sueños de gloria) is a 1953 Mexican drama film directed by Zacarías Gómez Urquiza and starring Miroslava, Luis Aguilar and José Baviera.

Cast
 Miroslava as Elsa  
 Luis Aguilar as Luis de la Mora  
 José Baviera as Don Guillermo Fernández  
 Alberto Mariscal as Ingeniero Ricardo Rojas  
 Gloria Mange as Coque  
 Quintín Bulnes as Chilaquil  
 Beatriz Saavedra as Esperanza  
 María Herrero as Amiga de Elsa  
 Javier de la Parra 
 Jorge Casanova as Alberto 
 Víctor Alcocer as Locutor  
 Daniel Arroyo as Anunciador comienzo carrera de autos 
 Manuel Casanueva as Cliente taller 
 Jorge Martínez de Hoyos as Jerónimo 
 Enrique Zambrano as Miembro comité organizador

References

Bibliography 
 María Luisa Amador. Cartelera cinematográfica, 1950-1959. UNAM, 1985.

External links 
 

1953 films
1953 drama films
Mexican drama films
1950s Spanish-language films
Films directed by Zacarías Gómez Urquiza
Mexican black-and-white films
1950s Mexican films